Kim Taek-Soo (Hangul: 김택수, Hanja: 金擇洙) (born May 25, 1970) is a former table tennis player from South Korea. He used a one-sided penhold style, compared to the newer style of reverse-backhand looping that has become the Chinese penhold standard.

In 2010, it was announced that Taek-Soo would succeed Yoo Nam-Kyu as head coach of South Korea's national table tennis team, with the date of the change to be determined.

He married archer Kim Jo-sun in 2000.

References

External links
profile

1970 births
Living people
South Korean male table tennis players
Table tennis players at the 1992 Summer Olympics
Table tennis players at the 1996 Summer Olympics
Table tennis players at the 2000 Summer Olympics
Olympic table tennis players of South Korea
Olympic bronze medalists for South Korea
Olympic medalists in table tennis
Asian Games medalists in table tennis
Table tennis players at the 1990 Asian Games
Table tennis players at the 1994 Asian Games
Table tennis players at the 1998 Asian Games
Table tennis players at the 2002 Asian Games
Asian Games gold medalists for South Korea
Asian Games silver medalists for South Korea
Asian Games bronze medalists for South Korea
Medalists at the 1990 Asian Games
Medalists at the 1994 Asian Games
Medalists at the 1998 Asian Games
Medalists at the 2002 Asian Games
South Korean table tennis coaches
Medalists at the 1992 Summer Olympics